Sahak Karapetovich Karapetyan (16 May 1906 – 6 December 1987) was a Soviet and Armenian physiologist and politician. Karapetyan served as the Chairman of the Council of Ministers of the Armenian Soviet Socialist Republic from 1947 to 1952.

References

1906 births
1987 deaths
20th-century biologists
People from Armavir, Armenia
Communist Party of the Soviet Union members
Foreign ministers of Armenia
Prime Ministers of Armenia
Second convocation members of the Supreme Soviet of the Soviet Union
Third convocation members of the Supreme Soviet of the Soviet Union
Recipients of the Order of Friendship of Peoples
Recipients of the Order of the Red Banner of Labour
Armenian physiologists
Soviet Armenians
Soviet physiologists